XHVG-FM 94.5/XEVG-AM 650 is a combo radio station in Mérida, Yucatán carrying Radio Fórmula programming.

History
The concession for 650 AM was awarded in 1987 to Audio Panorama. The FM station was added in 1994.

References

Radio stations in Yucatán
Radio Fórmula
Radio stations established in 1987
1987 establishments in Mexico